StageDoor Dinner Theatre was officially opened on 17 July 2002 by Judy Cornwell (Daisy from Keeping Up Appearances). StageDoor Dinner Theatre is Brisbane's first permanent dinner theatre, with more than 54 productions to date.

The dinner theatre is located in the lower level of the Twelfth Night Theatre complex in Bowen Hills, Brisbane. This is the permanent home to Starbuck Productions, a Queensland-based production company. Starbuck was established in early 1990s and has produced live entertainment in venues such as the Queensland Performing Arts Centre, The Suncorp Piazza, Seagulls International Showroom, the Twelfth Night Theatre and in regional touring venues throughout south east Queensland.

Productions have included Hollywood Legend Mickey Rooney, Rhonda Burchmore, The Australian Tom Jones Spectacular and Little Shop of Horrors.

The company is owned and run by radio and television producer and performer Damien Lee and dance school proprietor Doreen Thomas. Now at the StageDoor Dinner Theatre they have produced the classic Neil Simon comedy The Odd Couple, Dan Goggin's Nunsense, the award-winning rock musical Return to the Forbidden Planet, the family Christmas Pantomime SC Superstar, the New Year's cabaret Rock Down The Clock, the heartwarming British drama Beautiful Thing, and the Southern Hemisphere Premiere of Gilligan's Island: The Musical which had a run of 34 weeks, over three productions.

StageDoor has also held a number of single performance shows, for example featuring Tom Burlinson, Amanda Muggleton and more recently Ian Maurice.

Productions

2013
Gilligan’s Island the Musical 
The Great Easter Egg Hunt
Tuckshop the Musical

2012
Rock Down the Clock
Solid Gold Disco
Ghouls Night Out
David the Friendly Dragon
Getting Even with Steven
Mid Life the Crisis Musical
Alladin and his Really Cool Lamp

2011
Rock N Roll INFERNO 
David The Friendly Dragon 
Classic Elizabeth Taylor for Mother's Day
Getting Even With Steven
1970s CABARET PARTY 
MID-LIFE! The Crisis Musical
Aladdin and His Really Cool Lamp 
Santa Rocks 
Broadway Busted 
The Sacred Garden

2010
Rock Down the Clock
Rock n Roll Inferno
SC Superstar
Behind the Bright lights
The Super Family Fun Show
The Natasha York Duo
Mother and Son
The Great Easter Egg Hunt – 10–18 April
Dare to be Bare – March – April
Rocky Horror Show – February – March

2009
 Back to the 70s 80s 90s – 31 December
 G'Day Santa – 5 – 24 December
 Club 80s – 23 October – 19 December
 No News is Good News – 15 August – 17 October
 Super Family Fun Show – 19 September – 4 October
 Deathtrap – 19 June – 8 August
 Stiff – 17 – April 2008
 I Have a Hunch – 13 February – 111 April

2008
 Pop Goes the 70s – 31 December
 Spaced Out Santa – 6 – 24 December
 Solid Gold Disco – 22 October – 20 December
 Mavis Bramston Reloaded – 20 August – 18 October
 How to Get Almost Anyone to Sleep with You – 10 October
 Stagedoor Unplugged – 18 June – 16 August
 Little Tin Soldier – 30 June – 13 July
 Ian Maurice's Mother's Day Cabaret – Sunday 11 May 
 Bouncers – 19 April – 14 June 
 Ian Maurice Bears All with Natalie Mead – 30 March 
 Ian Maurice Bears All – 24 February 
 The Outback Pub – 14 February – 19 April

2007
 Rock Down the Clock – 31 December 2007
 Santa Rocks – 3–24 December 2007
 Rock n Roll Inferno – 12 October – 22 December 2007
 Agatha Christie's The Hollows – 10 August to 6 October 2007
 Naked Boys Singing – 8 June to 4 August 2007 
 The Enchanted Forest – 25 June to 8 July
 Shirley Valentine – 6 April to 2 June 2007 
 Ian Maurice's Mother's Day Cabaret – Sunday 13 May
 City Gym – The Musical –  2 February to 31 March 2007

2006
 Rock N Roll Beach Party – 31 December 2006 
 Gilligan's Island: The Musical –  12 October to 23 December 2006 
 Santa Down Under – 4 to 24 December 2006 
 Nunsensations: The Nunsense Vegas Revue – 3 August to 7 October 2006 
 Ghost Writers – 15 to July29uly 2006
 Ian Maurice – Live in cabaret – 23 July 2006
 The Emperor's New Clothes – 26 June – 9 July 2006
 Broadway Busted – 29 March-  27 May
 Me and Jezebel – 3 February to 25 March 2006

2005
 Blues Brothers Bash – 31 December 2005
 Pirates Down Under – 3 November to 24 December 
 SC Superstar – 28 November to 24 December 
 Walk this way – 22 September to 29 October 2005  
 Friends and Relations – 4 August to 17 September 2005  
 No News is Good News – 9 – June 2005  
 David the Friendly Dragon – 20 June – 3 July 2005
 Gilligan's Island: The Musical –  31 – March 2005 
 Agatha Christie's Murder on the Nile – 3 February to 26 March 2005

2004
 Stayin Alive 05 Disco – 31 December 2004
 Spaced Out Santa – 29 – November 2004
 Forbidden Planet – 28 October- 18 December 
 Dare to be Bare – 23 September – 23 October 
 A Swell Party – 26 – August
 The Sacred Garden – 1 – July 2004
 The Great Fairytale Robbery –  28 – June 
 The Rise and Fall of Little Voice – 6 May – 26 June 2004
 Bouncers – 11 March – 1 May 2004
 Beautiful Thing – 22 March – 13 April, 
 The First Sunday in December – 29 January – 6 March 2004
 Aladdin and his Really Cool Lamp –  5 to 25 January 2004

2003

 Rock Down the Clock – 31 December 2003
 SC Superstar – 3 to 24 December 2003
 The Outback Club – 6 – November 2003
 Look Who's Talking – 18 September – 1 November 2003
 Ladies Night – 26 August – 13 September 2003
 My Three Mothers in Law – 3 – July 2003
 An Intimate Luncheon with Amanda Muggleton – 17 July 2003
 Funny Money
 It's My Party and I'll Die If I Want To
 Rachel Beck & Ian Stenlake
 Tom Burlinson
 Sleuth

2002
 Rock Down the Clock – 31 December 2002
 SC Superstar – 25 November 22 December 2002
 A Bedful of Foreigners – 14 – October 2002
 Nunsense – 8 August – 27 October 2002
 The Odd Couple – 9 July to 8 August 2002

See also 
 List of dinner theaters
 Twelfth Night Theatre
 List of restaurant chains in Australia

References

External links 

Theatres in Brisbane
Dinner theatre
Companies based in Brisbane
Restaurants in Queensland